Taylor Elyse Tomlinson (born November 4, 1993) is an American comedian. She has released two Netflix stand-up specials called Quarter-Life Crisis (2020) and Look At You (2022).

Early life
Taylor Elyse Tomlinson was born in Orange County, California. She was raised in Temecula, California, where she graduated from Temecula Valley High School. She briefly attended California Polytechnic State University, San Luis Obispo before transferring to a community college in the San Diego metropolitan area to be closer to comedy clubs for her career. She then attended California State University San Marcos before dropping out to pursue her budding comedy career full time. She and her three younger siblings were raised in a devout Christian family, which features prominently in her comedy routines. When she was eight years old, her mother died of cancer. Her father remarried a year later.

Career 
Tomlinson began performing comedy when she was 16, after her father signed her up for a stand-up class. She performed in church basements, school venues, and coffee shops. She became a top 10 finalist on the ninth season of NBC's Last Comic Standing in 2015, and was named one of the "Top 10 Comics to Watch" by Variety at the 2019 Just for Laughs Festival. She has appeared on The Tonight Show, Conan, and various Comedy Central productions. She developed a sitcom for ABC in 2017, but it was not picked up for a pilot. She performed a 15-minute set on an episode of the Netflix stand-up series The Comedy Lineup in 2018.

Tomlinson's first Netflix stand-up special, Quarter-Life Crisis, premiered in March 2020. Later that year, she toured with fellow comedian Whitney Cummings on the Codependent Tour. She was also part of the podcast Self-Helpless with fellow comedians Kelsey Cook and Delanie Fischer that year. In 2021, she started her own podcast called Sad in the City.  She was placed on the Forbes 30 Under 30 list in December 2021. Her second Netflix stand-up special, Look At You, premiered in March 2022.

Social media 
Tomlinson has been very successful using TikTok, making her the 7th most followed woman comedian on the platform in 2022. Her popularity helped her acquire a sponsorship from Hotels.com, which she promotes on TikTok. In 2021, Tomlinson began hosting a video podcast, distributed on YouTube, titled Sad in the City.

Personal life
Tomlinson said in her stand-up special, Look At You, that she was once engaged, but called it off, before taping her first special. Her stand-up material references her experiences of mental health issues including depression, and in Look At You she discusses being diagnosed with bipolar disorder.

Tomlinson was in a relationship with fellow comedian Sam Morril from March 2020 to February 2022.

References

External links 
 
 
 
 

1993 births
Living people
21st-century American comedians
21st-century American women
American stand-up comedians
American TikTokers
American women comedians
Comedians from California
People with bipolar disorder
People from Temecula, California